Asterotremella albida is a species of fungus first described by C. Ramírez in 1957. It is also referred to as Cryptococcus ramirezgomezianus.

References 

Fungi described in 1957
Parasitic fungi
Parasites
Agaricomycetes